Walter Drawbridge Crick (15 Dec. 1857, Hanslope – 23 Dec. 1903) was an English businessman, amateur geologist and palaeontologist.  He published with Charles Darwin.  He was the grandfather (by his son Harry) of Francis Crick, the molecular geneticist.

Born at Pinion End Farm, Hanslope, Crick went into business as a shoemaker, founding a company based at St Giles Street, Northampton that was inherited by his son Walter.

References

Amateur geologists
Shoemakers
English businesspeople in fashion
19th-century British geologists
English palaeontologists
Fellows of the Geological Society of London
1857 births
1903 deaths
19th-century English businesspeople